Dejan Parežanin (born 27 May 1971) is a Serbian professional basketball coach and former player who is the current head coach for Astana of the VTB United League and the Kazakhstan Championship.

Playing career 
A point guard, Parežanin spent 17 seasons in Yugoslavia and Bosnia and Herzegovina, from 1988 to 2005. During his playing days, he played for Partizan, Infos RTM Beograd, OKK Beograd, OKK Kikinda, Radnički Beograd, Igokea and Bosna. He retired as a player with Bosna in 2005.

Coaching career 
After retirement in 2005, Parežanin joined Vogošća as their head coach. During the 2007–08 season, he was an assistant coach for Bosna under Jure Zdovc. Later, Parežanin was again the head coach for Vogošća prior he signed for Bosna in January 2010. He left Bosnia in April 2011.

In June 2011, Zrinjski hired Parežanin as their new head coach. He parted ways with Zrinjski in December 2011.

In 2017, Parežanin was appointed as the head coach for the Astana Presidential Club Basketball Academy. In March 2022, Astana hired Parežanin as their new head coach, following departure of Darko Russo.

National teams 
Parežanin was an assistant coach for the Kazakhstan national team at the 2022 FIBA Asia Cup qualification.

References

External links 
 Dejan Parezanin Coach Profile at eurobasket.com
 Dejan Parezanin Player Profile at eurobasket.com
 Player Profile at proballers.com
 Dejan Parežanin Player Profile at aba-liga.com

1971 births
Living people
ABA League players
BC Astana coaches
BKK Radnički players
KK Bosna Royal coaches
KK Bosna Royal players
KK Igokea players
KK IMT Beograd players
KK Partizan players
KK Vojvodina Srbijagas coaches
OKK Beograd players
OKK Kikinda players
Serbian expatriate basketball people in Bosnia and Herzegovina
Serbian expatriate basketball people in Kazakhstan
Serbian men's basketball coaches
Serbian men's basketball players
People from Zemun
Point guards
Yugoslav men's basketball players